Notodryas is a genus of moths in the family Epermeniidae. Its species all occur in Australia.

Species
Notodryas aeria Meyrick, 1897
Notodryas callierga Meyrick, 1906
Notodryas encrita (Lower, 1920)
Notodryas vallata Meyrick, 1897

References

Epermeniidae